The 2019–20 Dynamo Dresden season is the 70th season in the football club's history and 4th consecutive season in the second division of German football, the 2. Bundesliga and 9th overall.

Season summary 
Dynamo Dresden competed in the 2. Bundesliga, having finished 12th during the previous season. On 2 December 2019, following a 2–1 defeat to Holstein Kiel, the club parted company with manager Cristian Fiél. On 10 December 2019, Markus Kauczinski was appointed as his successor. The club finished bottom on 32 points, and were relegated to the 3. Liga.

Squad

First-team squad

Left club during season

Transfers

Transfers in

Loans in

Transfers out

Loans out

Friendly matches

Competitions

2. Bundesliga

League table

Results

DFB Pokal

Player statistics

Appearances and goals

Notes

References

External links 
 Dynamo Dresden 

Dynamo Dresden seasons
Dresden, Dynamo